Rewind was an Australian television program that aired on the Australian Broadcasting Corporation in 2004. Rewind was part of an initiative to make programs about Australian history and used several historians as presenters. Rewind aired 14 episodes in its first season, before its cancellation.

References

Australian Broadcasting Corporation original programming
Australian non-fiction television series
2004 Australian television series debuts
2000s Australian television series
English-language television shows